The William Raymond Prom Memorial Bridge, commonly known as the 31st Street Bridge, is an arch bridge that carries vehicular traffic across the Allegheny River between the Pittsburgh neighborhoods of Troy Hill and the Strip District. The bridge passes over, but does not serve, Washington's Landing, which is connected to the mainland by the 30th Street Bridge. Sidewalks along the bridge feature viewing platforms.

History 
The bridge was built in 1927–1928 to replace an earlier through truss bridge aligned with 30th Street. This earlier bridge was built in 1887 but was destroyed by fire on July 8, 1921. The 1887 bridge itself replaced a two span iron truss which was destroyed by a flood in 1882. A cable suspension footbridge was provided as a crossing whilst the new 31st Street bridge was being constructed.

The bridge was due to close on Tuesday January 31, 2006 for a proposed $27 million refurbishment which would take two years. It eventually closed on February 14, 2006 and reopened by Mayor Luke Ravenstahl on November 21, 2007.

The portion of the bridge over the river's back channel was demolished on August 16, 2012 as part of improvements on adjacent Route 28.

The bridge was renamed in 2013, from its former name of Thirty-First Street Bridge, Number Six Allegheny River to  William Raymond Prom Memorial Bridge, to honor William R. Prom, who was killed in Vietnam.

See also 
List of crossings of the Allegheny River

References

External links 

 

Bridges over the Allegheny River
Bridges completed in 1928
Road bridges in Pennsylvania
1928 establishments in Pennsylvania
Open-spandrel deck arch bridges in the United States
Bridges in Pittsburgh